Sankt Georgen an der Leys (Central Bavarian: Sankt Geoang) is a municipality in the district of Scheibbs in Lower Austria, in northeast Austria.

Population

References

External links 
 www.stgeorgenleys.at - city website

Cities and towns in Scheibbs District